Commodore Anthony Morrow  is a retired senior Royal Navy officer. He is best known for being the last commanding officer of the Royal Yacht Britannia.

Naval career 
Morrow joined the Royal Navy in 1962. He was given command of several vessels including HMS Lindisfarne in 1979, HMS Active in 1983, and HMS Mercury, a shore establishment and site of the Royal Navy Signals School in 1988.

In April 1995 he was appointed Flag Officer, Royal Yachts and subsequently took command of the Royal Yacht Britannia. He served as captain during the Handover of Hong Kong in 1997 when the yacht took Governor of Hong Kong, Chris Patten and the Prince of Wales back to the United Kingdom following the transfer of sovereignty. He would be the yacht's final captain as it was decommissioned later that year on 11 December.

In December 1997, following the decommissioning of HMY Britannia, Elizabeth II appointed him a Commander of the Royal Victorian Order (CVO) in recognition of his services.

References 

Living people
Royal Navy officers
Royal Navy commodores
Commanders of the Royal Victorian Order
Year of birth missing (living people)